The Grigsby Estate is a historic estate and hobby farm at 125 Buckley Road in Barrington Hills, Illinois. The house was built in 1930 for Bertram James Grigsby, an electrical engineer and president of a radio manufacturing company, and his wife Elsie. Architecture firm Rowe, Dillard and Rowe designed the estate's Tudor Revival manor house for the couple, a style which reflected the couple's time in England; Elsie was born there, while Bertram worked there for several years. The house's design features an asymmetrical form, half-timbering, decorative brickwork, and several brick chimneys. The estate also includes a guest house, a garage, a greenhouse, a farmhouse, a barn, a milkhouse, a firefighting shed, and a machinery shed. The estate was typical of early development in the Barrington Hills area, which mainly consisted of estates and hobby farms that were often inspired by English country life.

The estate was added to the National Register of Historic Places on May 12, 1987.

References

National Register of Historic Places in Lake County, Illinois
Tudor Revival architecture in Illinois
Houses completed in 1930
Farms on the National Register of Historic Places in Illinois